was a Japanese stage and film actor. He appeared in more than 100 films.

Career
Graduating from Waseda University, Katō first became a middle school teacher, but then joined the Bungakuza theater troupe in 1952. Beyond appearing in and directing plays on stage, he also appeared in films by such directors as Akira Kurosawa, Shohei Imamura, Kon Ichikawa, and Kiriro Urayama.

He died on 31 July 2015 after collapsing in a sauna.

Selected filmography

Films

Television

References

External links 

1929 births
2015 deaths
Japanese male film actors
Japanese male stage actors
Japanese theatre directors
Male actors from Tokyo
Waseda University alumni